Pseudoclitocybe cyathiformis, commonly known as the goblet funnel cap, is a species of fungus in the family Pseudoclitocybaceae, and the type species of the genus Pseudoclitocybe. It was first described scientifically as Agaricus cyathiformis by Jean Baptiste François Pierre Bulliard in 1786, and later transferred to the genus Pseudoclitocybe by Rolf Singer in 1956. The fungus is found in North America and Europe.

References

External links

Fungi of Europe
Fungi of North America
Fungi described in 1786